This is a list of characters from the TNT television series Falling Skies.

Main characters

Supporting characters

Alien races

Skitters 
Originally thought to be the alien species responsible for invading Earth, the Skitters are a race under control of the Overlords. Their home world was subjugated by the Overlords and the Skitters were harnessed just like the children of Earth. Some Skitters have been able to overcome their controllers and plot rebellions against the Overlords.

Mechs 
Bipedal robotic drones that fight alongside the Skitters. Destroyed Mechs are entirely mechanical inside, so there is no "pilot," implying that they are unmanned drones. Those who control mechs can put them into guard/patrol mode, give special orders violating their usual protocol  and assign priority targets. These commands are followed even if the commander is dead, implying that they have primitive A.I. that allows them to some extent think on their own. It seems that harnessed children can also order Mechs,  such as when Karen Nadler orders a Mech to execute Boon (This implies that harnessed children have a military rank system). The Mechs, along with all other Espheni mechanized servants,  are disabled when Alexis Glass-Mason sacrifices herself to destroy the Espheni power core.

Mechs produce a distinct mechanical moan every now and then for reasons unknown.

Harnesses 
Are parasitic creatures that allow other races to completely control the wearer. It was not known that these were their own creature (and not just a piece of biomechanical equipment) until season 2. Their real names are chemlocks, according to Red Eye, the leader of the Skitter rebellion. In Season 4 a new type of harness is featured, used to mutate human adults into humanoid skitters. The Harnesses are permanently disabled when Alexis Glass-Mason destroys the Espheni power core along with all other Espheni technology. Though de-Harnessed, Ben Mason still retains the spikes from the Harness and the enhanced abilities granted by it. It also allows him to communicate with the Espheni and Skitters and use the Espehni Shadow Plane device.

Espheni / "Overlords" 
The force behind the invasion of Earth. The Espheni were introduced late in season 1. They have a very large intellectual capacity, able to control many harnessed individuals at once using merely their mind. In the Season 2 finale their actual name was introduced. The Espheni are wiped out in the series finale by Tom Mason with a Dornia bioweapon. In season 4, the Scorched Overlord reveals that part of the Espheni motivation is that they are running from their great enemy, the Dornia, and are conquering worlds to fuel their war machine. They serve a queen who states that the second reason for their attack is revenge for the death of her daughter during a failed invasion 1,500 years before the one in the series.

Crawlies 
Small creatures under control of the Overlords and used to flush people out of narrow spaces,  as they can eat through metal. They have only appeared in one episode, when they use Jamil Dexter's body as a Trojan Horse and crawled out when the others are near. They were mentioned in another by the end of Season 2.

"Eye Worms" 
Small biomechanical parasites that hide in or near the skin covering the eye of their hosts. They appear to be designed by the Espheni for surveillance, and to turn their hosts into sleeper agents. Tom Mason, Hal Mason and Lourdes have carried eye worms. Anne Glass removes the first known eye worm from Tom Mason's eye with forceps, which causes him excruciating pain. In season 3, Volm technology can remove them without harm. Lourdes hosted several eye worms, making her kill multiple people, including the President of the United States, and causing her extreme pain until Alexis removed them.

Volm 
Arriving at the very end of the final episode of season 2, Volm are a race which claims to have been at war with the Espheni for longer than most Volm have been alive.  The Espheni took their planet long ago.  In Season 3, the Volm set up a base by Charleston, South Carolina, and are building a weapon to take down the Espheni defense grid for reinforcements to fight the Espheni. They succeed in taking down the defense grid by destroying the mothership in Boston and Volm reinforcements arrive led by the father of Cochise, the humans' main Volm ally. The Volm force the Espheni into retreating to the northern areas of the planet and plan to force the humans into safety in camps in Brazil, but Tom Mason is able to convince the Volm leader to let them stay and fight, which the Volm never allow on planets they help. In Season 4 the greater Volm forces leave Earth to engage the Espheni, who in the meantime attacked their young and brood mates. It's later revealed that the Volm gave up on Earth after the attack on their young and the devastating counterattack on humanity, but Cochise, the Volm leader who had aided the humans since the end of season 2, refuses to give up and remains behind on Earth with a small group of soldiers to continue the fight. During the attack on the Espheni power core at the end of season 4, the Volm mothership returns in time to aid in the destruction of the power core by destroying an attacking Beamer squadron. However, the Volm are not able to find Tom Mason's Beamer after it is blown into deep space. Tom is eventually rescued by the Dornia and continues working with Cochise and his men to fight the now-weakened Espheni. While Cochise nearly dies due to a failing organ, his father saves him with an organ transplant at the cost of his own life as he believes that Cochise's survival is more important to the Volm battle plan than his own. Cochise aids the human resistance in their war with the Espheni and takes part in the assault on Washington, D.C. The Espheni are destroyed by Tom Mason in the series finale,  Reborn, with a Dornia bioweapon and the Volm war with them ends. A Volm delegation including Cochise attends a united humanity's gathering to choose a new leader months after the invasion ends.

"Black Hornets" 
Skitters once part of the rebellion, but now captured and controlled into mindless drones. They have the ability to fly. They are massive in size and covered in engorged, tumorlike growths. Unlike their less-evolved kin, they have blue eyes, four wings and an elongated tail. Their tails are prehensile and incredibly strong, allowing them to effortlessly carry objects as big as a grown man into the sky. A Black Hornet attack delays the 2nd Mass' attack on Washington, D.C. with the Black Hornets dropping man-made bombs on the humans before being driven off. During the final battle, Black Hornets are seen flying all over Washington. When Tom Mason kills the Espheni Queen with a Dornia bioweapon, the bioweapon spreads to all the Espheni and they die out. As a result, Black Hornets are seen exploding all over the Washington skyline.

Dornia / "Great Enemy" 
Mentioned in "The Eye," this alien race drove the Espheni from their home galaxy which caused them to flee to the Milky Way Galaxy, conquering planet after planet. They are indirectly responsible for the Invasion of Earth, the Volm-Espheni War, and the enslavement of the Skitters. According to the Espheni overlord Scorch, they are fast approaching the Solar System. One Dornia appeared to Tom after his Beamer was flung to the edge of the Solar System, creating a room that mimicked his Boston bedroom. It has been identified by Cochise that the Dornia were the original species that was enslaved by the Espheni and mutated into Skitters. This Dornia returned Tom to Earth and began guiding him against the Espheni. It reveals to him that it is the last of its race and it believes that Tom can help it wipe out the Espheni and avenge the genocide of the Dornia. The Dornia gives Tom a biological weapon that when used on the Espheni Queen, will wipe out the Espheni. While the weapon is proven to be lethal to humans too, Marty manages to modify it so that it isn't. Anne Mason worries that the Dornia is just using the humans and that is why they made the weapon lethal to humans as well, but Cochise suggests they simply didn't realize they did that. In the series finale, Reborn, Tom manages to use the Dornia bioweapon on the Espheni Queen, killing her and spreading the bioweapon to the entire Espheni race through her organic connection to them. The Espheni are wiped out and Tom returns to the beach with a dead Anne to plead with the Dornia to save her since he gave them their vengeance when he wiped out the Espheni. After a moment, tentacles emerge from beneath the water and pull Anne under. The Dornia resurrect Anne and return her and her unborn child safely to Tom. It is unknown what happens to them after this.

Espheni-generated humans 
Following the loss of their power core and mechanized servants, the Espheni adopted a new tactic of killing important humans and replacing them with Espheni clones who possess all of their knowledge and personality, but are programmed to perform a specific task. It is unknown how many of these humans exist, but the 2nd Mass encounter two: Katie Marshall and Alexis Glass-Mason. It is stated that these humans are so well-made that even with his spikes, Ben Mason can't tell them apart from regular humans. They bleed black blood however. Six weeks before the 2nd Mass encountered the 14th Virginia, the Espheni killed militia leader Captain Katie Marshall and replaced her with a clone who took commands from an Overlord who kept an eye on her base. Under the command of this copy of Marshall, the 14th Virginia began hunting what they believed were human collaborators but were actually resistance soldiers dangerous to the Espheni. When Marshall tries to execute the Mason family, her true nature is exposed and she is killed. Shortly afterwards, the Espheni create a clone of Alexis Glass-Mason in hopes of assassinating Tom Mason before he reaches Washington and the Espheni Queen. Due to the encounter with the Marshall clone, the 2nd Mass is left suspicious of the Alexis clone's story. However, they manage to learn from her the importance of the Espheni Queen being on Earth and that the Espheni have been here before. When the Alexis clone attacks Tom, his son Ben hits her with a Dornia bioweapon, killing her. Any other clones in existence were wiped out when the bioweapon was spread through the Espheni and their various races by Tom.

Espheni Queen 
The supreme ruler of the Espheni. She is also the power behind the invasion.  The Queen is worshipped by the Espheni like a god and has an organic connection to her entire race. The Queen sent an invasion 1,500 years ago led by her beloved daughter, but underestimated humanity and the Espheni were defeated and her daughter killed. Enraged, the Espheni Queen vowed to return a thousand times stronger to wipe out humanity in revenge for her daughter's death. Cochise's reaction to the discovery of the Queen's existence suggests that the Volm are aware of the possibility of her existence, but have never encountered her in person before and didn't know for sure that she was real. According to an Espheni-generated clone of Alexis Glass-Mason, the Queen only comes to a planet when victory is certain and that her presence means that the Espheni are switching objectives from invasion to occupation. Months after the destruction of the Espheni power core and the loss of the Espheni mechanized servants, the 2nd Mass learn of her existence from Ben Mason using an Espheni communications device and witnessing a ritual to her. Ben begins using the device to try to locate the Queen who creates a clone of Alexis Glass-Mason to try to assassinate Tom Mason, the human resistance leader. The clone fails and Ben locates a clue that states that the Queen is "at the foot of the giant." Having figured out they need to go to Washington already, Tom determines that the clue means that the Queen is at the Lincoln Memorial. While all the militias in the United States assault a powerful defensive wall around the city, Tom leads a strike team through the city's service tunnels to reach the Memorial and kill the Queen. Tom gets separated from the rest of the team but reaches the Lincoln Memorial where Tom and the Queen finally confront each other face to face. The Queen pins Tom to a wall with webbing and telepathically shows him the true reason for the Espheni invasion and believes that when she kills him, human resistance will fall. Tom insists that humanity will never gave up and she didn't learn from her first mistake. The Queen begins to drain Tom's blood, but he manages to reach a bioweapon supplied to him by the Dornia and infects himself with it. While Tom is immune to the weapon thanks to Marty's modifications to it, the Queen absorbs the virus through the blood she sucks from Tom's body and is infected. The Queen quickly removes her sucker, but it is too late and she is killed by the bioweapon. The bioweapon spreads through the Espheni Queen's connection to her entire race and the Espheni are wiped out and Earth is freed.

References 

 

de:Falling Skies#Figuren
fr:Falling Skies#Personnages
it:Falling Skies#Personaggi e interpreti